United Nations Security Council resolution 490 was adopted unanimously on 21 July 1981, after taking note of a report by the secretary-general. The council called for an immediate cessation of attacks by Israel on Lebanon.

The council went on to demand that Israel respect the territorial integrity of Lebanon, and requested the secretary-general to report back on the situation within 48 hours.

See also
 1982 Lebanon War
 Blue Line
 Israeli–Lebanese conflict
 List of United Nations Security Council Resolutions 401 to 500 (1976–1982)

References
Text of the Resolution at undocs.org

External links
 

 0490
Israeli–Lebanese conflict
 0490
1981 in Israel
 0490
July 1981 events